"Love Is Such a Lonely Sword" is a song by Blue System. It is the first track on their 1990 fourth studio album, Obsession, and was released as its second lead single a couple of months prior.

The single debuted at number 65 in Germany for the week of September 10, 1990, peaking at number 16 seven weeks later.

The song has a vocal appearance by Audrey Motaung.

Composition 
The song is written and produced by Dieter Bohlen.

Charts

References

External links 
 

1990 songs
1990 singles
Blue System songs
Hansa Records singles
Songs written by Dieter Bohlen
Song recordings produced by Dieter Bohlen